The 1994–95 Southern Football League season was the 92nd in the history of the league, an English football competition.

Hednesford Town won the Premier Division and earned promotion to the Football Conference. Solihull Borough, Sittingbourne, Trowbridge Town and Corby Town were relegated to the Midland and Southern Divisions, whilst Newport, Salisbury City, Ilkeston Town and Baldock Town were promoted to the Premier Division, the former two as champions.

The clubs finishing bottom of the Midland and Southern Divisions, Armitage and Burnham, were relegated to level eight leagues.

Premier Division
The Premier Division consisted of 22 clubs, including 17 clubs from the previous season and five new clubs:
Two clubs promoted from the Midland Division:
Rushden & Diamonds
VS Rugby

Two clubs promoted from the Southern Division:
Gravesend & Northfleet
Sudbury Town

Plus:
Leek Town, transferred from the Northern Premier League Premier Division

League table

Midland Division
The Midland Division consisted of 22 clubs, including 17 clubs from the previous season and five new clubs:
Two clubs relegated from the Premier Division:
Moor Green
Nuneaton Borough

Plus:
Buckingham Town, transferred from the Southern Division
Ilkeston Town, promoted from the West Midlands (Regional) League
Rothwell Town, promoted from the United Counties League

League table

Southern Division
The Southern Division consisted of 22 clubs, including 17 clubs from the previous season and five new clubs:
Three clubs transferred from the Midland Division:
Clevedon Town
Weston-super-Mare
Yate Town

Two clubs relegated from the Premier Division:
Bashley
Waterlooville

League table

See also
Southern Football League
1994–95 Isthmian League
1994–95 Northern Premier League

References

Southern Football League seasons
6